La Rivière station is a railway station in the commune of La Rivière-Drugeon, in the French department of Doubs, in the Bourgogne-Franche-Comté region. It is an intermediate stop on the Frasne–Les Verrières line of SNCF.

Services
The following services stop at La Rivière:

References

External links 
 
 

Riviere